The Sorbonne declaration may refer to either:
 The Sorbonne Declaration (1998), part of the Bologna Process relating to higher education.
 The Sorbonne declaration on research data rights (2020), a declaration in support of FAIR data.